Art and Architecture Journal (A&AJ) was a printed quarterly art magazine published between 1980 and 2009. Edited by Jeremy Hunt it was re-launched with issue 61 in February 2005. 
 
AAJPress is the successor to the Art and Architecture Journal currently presented as an online blog, providing information and communication on public art commissions, projects, collaboration and architecture based in the United Kingdom.

AAJPress includes: commemorative and memorial public art – environmental and land art - sculpture parks and gardens – architecture and urban design - urban regeneration - corporate collections - art in health - interior design – crafts and applied art - education and training - 20th century history and theory - critical debate and dialogue - temporary projects, performance and installations - festivals and biennales -political and community issues - experimental areas of film, digital media and sound - literature, dance and music as public art.

External links 
         
 
 Atoll Collaborative: A&AJ articles

1980 establishments in the United Kingdom
2009 disestablishments in the United Kingdom
Architecture magazines
Defunct magazines published in the United Kingdom
English-language magazines
Magazines established in 1980
Magazines disestablished in 2009
Quarterly magazines published in the United Kingdom
Visual arts magazines published in the United Kingdom